Banaras Colony  is a neighborhood in the Karachi West district of Karachi, Pakistan. It was previously administered as part of the SITE Town borough, which was disbanded in 2011. 

Most of the population are Pakhtuns.

Main areas 
 Subhani Muhalla
 Rehmani Muhalla
 Rabbani Muhalla
 Frantier Colony

References

External links 
 Karachi Website.
 Local Government Sindh.

Neighbourhoods of Karachi
SITE Town